About 80 ancient monumental brasses survive in Gloucestershire, many in the parish churches at Cirencester and Northleach. Many have been lost to theft over the ages. The first complete listing of brasses in Gloucestershire was made by Cecil T Davis who stated that they may be divided into three categories: ecclesiastical, military and civil.

List of monumental brasses of Gloucestershire

References

Sources
Davis, Cecil T. (1881-2) List of Monumental Brasses in Gloucestershire, Bristol and Gloucestershire Archaeological Society, Vol. 6, Transactions at Gloucester.
Davis, Cecil T. (1899) The Monumental Brasses of Gloucestershire.

 
English monumental brasses